Jocelyn Willoughby (born March 25, 1998) is an American basketball player for the New York Liberty of the Women's National Basketball Association (WNBA). She played college basketball for the University of Virginia Cavaliers of the Atlantic Coast Conference.

A resident of East Orange, New Jersey, Willoughby played prep basketball at Newark Academy.

Willoughby led the ACC in scoring as a senior, averaging 19.2 points and 7.7 rebounds per game.

The Phoenix Mercury selected Willoughby with the 10th pick in the 2020 WNBA Draft, only to trade her to the New York Liberty in exchange for Shatori Walker-Kimbrough.

Career statistics

College
Source

WNBA

Regular season

|-
| style='text-align:left;'|2020
| style='text-align:left;'|New York
| 22 || 5 || 17.4 || .358 || .405 || .833 || 2.4 || 0.9 || 0.7 || 0.3 || 1.5 || 5.8
|-
| style='text-align:left;'|2022
| style='text-align:left;'|New York
| 11 || 4 || 11.0 || .423 || .273 || .500 || 1.6 || 0.4 || 0.5 || 0.2 || 0.8 || 2.6
|-
| style='text-align:left;'| Career
| style='text-align:left;'| 2 years, 1 team
| 33 || 9 || 15.3 || .370 || .375 || .780 || 2.2 || 0.7 || 0.6 || 0.2 || 1.2 || 4.8

Playoffs

|-
| style='text-align:left;'|2022
| style='text-align:left;'|New York
| 2 || 0 || 7.0 || 1.000 || .000 || .667 || 0.5 || 0.0 || 0.0 || 0.0 || 0.5 || 3.0
|-
| style='text-align:left;'| Career
| style='text-align:left;'| 1 year, 1 team
| 2 || 0 || 7.0 || 1.000 || .000 || .667 || 0.5 || 0.0 || 0.0 || 0.0 || 0.5 || 3.0

References

1998 births
Living people
American women's basketball players
Basketball players from Newark, New Jersey
Newark Academy alumni
New York Liberty players
Phoenix Mercury draft picks
Shooting guards
Small forwards
Sportspeople from East Orange, New Jersey
Virginia Cavaliers women's basketball players